Frogley is a surname. Notable people with the surname include:

Michael Frogley, palaeoecologist
Roger Frogley (1908–1974), British motorcycle speedway rider